Abra is both a given name and a surname. Notable people with the name include:

 Douglas Abra (born 1947), judge of Manitoba, Canada
 Abra of Poitiers (aka Saint Abra) (c.343–c.360), French saint
 Abra Moore (born 1969), Irish-American singer-songwriter
 Abra Prentice Wilkin (born 1942), American philanthropist, socialite and member of the Rockefeller Family
 Abra (rapper), stage name of Filipino rapper Raymond Abracosa (born 1990)
 Abra Amedomé, Togolese politician
 Abra K. Maynard (1803-1894), American farmer and politician
 Abra J. Powers (1883-1971), American lawyer and politician

Fictional characters:
 Abra Durant, a fictional surgeon in the British television series Holby City
 Abra Kadabra (comics), a DC comic book supervillain
 Abra Bacon, young woman in John Steinbeck's novel East of Eden
 Abra Stone, a girl in Stephen King's novel Doctor Sleep
 Abra Walsh, a young woman in Nora Roberts' novel "Whiskey Beach"
 Abra, the maid of Judith

References